Zvoleněves is a municipality and village in Kladno District in the Central Bohemian Region of the Czech Republic. It has about 900 inhabitants.

Notable people
Eva Urbanová (born 1961), operatic soprano

References

Villages in Kladno District